Rachel McQuillan (born 2 December 1971) is a retired tennis player from Australia.

She was an Australian Institute of Sport scholarship holder. She won five WTA Tour doubles titles, as well as 14 singles and 21 doubles titles on the ITF Women's Circuit. She reached the mixed doubles semifinals at the 1995 and 1998 French Opens and at the 1996 US Open, each time partnering David Macpherson. She won a bronze medal in doubles at the 1992 Summer Olympics, partnering Nicole Bradtke. McQuillan reached career-high rankings of No. 28 in singles and 15 in doubles.

WTA career finals

Singles: 7 (0–7)

Doubles: 16 (5–11)

ITF finals

Singles: 20 (14–6)

Doubles: 31 (20–11)

References

External links
 
 
 
 

1971 births
Australian female tennis players
Hopman Cup competitors
Living people
Olympic bronze medalists for Australia
Olympic medalists in tennis
Olympic tennis players of Australia
Sportswomen from New South Wales
Sportspeople from Newcastle, New South Wales
Tennis people from New South Wales
Tennis players at the 1992 Summer Olympics
Tennis players at the 1996 Summer Olympics
Wimbledon junior champions
Australian Institute of Sport tennis players
Medalists at the 1992 Summer Olympics
Grand Slam (tennis) champions in girls' doubles
20th-century Australian women